The Armenian Monastic Ensembles of Iran, located in the West Azerbaijan and East Azerbaijan provinces in Iran, is an ensemble of three Armenian churches that were established during the period between the 7th and 14th centuries A.D. The edifices—the St. Thaddeus Monastery, the Saint Stepanos Monastery, and the Chapel of Dzordzor—have undergone many renovations. These sites were inscribed as cultural heritages in the 32nd session of the World Heritage Committee on 8 July 2008 under the UNESCO’s World Heritage List. They represent the last vestiges of old Armenian culture in its southeastern periphery. The ensemble is in a good state of preservation.

Location
The Armenian Monastic Ensembles of Iran are located in the West Azerbaijan and East Azerbaijan provinces in Iran. The ensemble consists of three Armenian churches that were established during the period between the 7th and 14th centuries A.D. The edifices—the St. Thaddeus Monastery, the Saint Stepanos Monastery, and the Chapel of Dzordzor—have undergone many renovations.

History
The Armenian people are native to Armenian Highlands which is also part of northwestern Iran—known as Iranian Azerbaijan. Armenia converted to Christianity in the early 4th century A.D. A portion of the region forms part of historical Armenia. Some of the oldest Armenian chapels, monasteries and churches in the world are located within this region of Iran, and the Iranian Azerbaijan region in general is home to the oldest churches in Iran. 

According to unverified reports it is believed that St. Thaddeus was buried at the site of the St. Thaddeus Monastery in the 1st century A.D., and that St. Gregory was responsible for establishing a monastery here in the 4th century. However, there is recorded proof that St. Thaddeus Monastery dates to the 7th century. It was the second Armenian church to be built, following the Etchmiadzin Cathedral and was the seat of the diocese in the 10th century. It was destroyed in an earthquake in 1319 and was rebuilt due to the efforts of Bishop Zachariah in the 1320s.

During the reign of the Safavid dynasty in the 15th century, the monasteries were preserved. The monasteries were then deserted during the 16th and 17th centuries following a period of attacks by the Ottomans that prompted many Armenians to emigrate to central Iran. Once the Safavids reestablished themselves in the area, the monasteries were reoccupied and renovated. However, during the 18th century the area became a cauldron of conflicts for domination among the Russian, Ottoman, and Persian empires. When the Persians finally gained control, the monasteries were damaged. During the Qajar era, Armenians regained control over the monasteries and they were rebuilt. The existing St. Thaddeus Monastery was rebuilt in 1814 and refurbished in the 1970s.

Similarly, it is recorded that Saint Stepanos Monastery was first established in 649 A.D. and a new building constructed at the same location in the 10th century. It was a major Christian church during the history of Armenian independence and development. After it suffered damages due to earthquake, it was rebuilt by Bishop Zachariah in the 1320s. During the entire 14th century, it was the centre of influence in the region for Christian missionary work. This period marked the creation of literary manuscripts and paintings on religious themes. The monastery was rebuilt during the period from 1819 to 1825 and again became a center of religious activity. It was refurbished in the 1970s, and again during the period from 1983 to 2001.

The Dzordzor Chapel was built on the bank of the Makuchay River at Dzordzor by Bishop Zachariah in 1314 on very modest lines, making use of the vestiges of an earlier religious monument dated between the 10th and 12th centuries. During the period of Ottoman rule, some parts of the building were destroyed. Later, the chapel came under threat of submergence from a proposed dam and had to be shifted to a new location upstream.

World heritage status
The three monasteries of the ensemble were inscribed on 2008
under UNESCO criteria (ii), (iii), and (vi) for their outstanding value in showcasing Armenian architectural and decorative traditions, for being a major centre for diffusion of Armenian culture in the region, and for being a place of pilgrimage of the apostle St. Thaddeus, a key figure in Armenian religious traditions. They represent the last vestiges of old Armenian culture in its southeastern periphery. The ensemble is in a good state of preservation.

Architecture
 
The three monuments represent a blend of architectural styles from the Byzantine, Persian, Eastern Orthodox, Assyrian, Persian, Muslim, and Armenian cultures.

Saint Thaddeus Monastery
Adjoining this wall, residential quarters have been built for the monks. There is a large entrance that is built on four pillars. The main church—the so-called White Church—is built on a Greek cross plan. It has an umbrella-shaped dome and a bell tower. There is also a Black Church, the oldest part of the ensemble, which is also crowned by a dome. The exterior artwork consists of cut-stone fascia of different colours, an Armenian architectural art form. The ornamentation in the interior is a blend of Armenian and Persian themes. There are also three more chapels to the northeast of the main monastery.

In one of the two cemeteries next to this chapel there is a sarcophagus.

Saint Stepanos Monastery
The Saint Stepanos Monastery ensemble is in the gorge of the Araxe River, which borders Azerbaijan. There are also residences built for the monks next to the monastery. A four-pillared entrance is topped by a bell tower built in two levels; the first level is rectangular in shape, and at the second level there are pillars supporting an umbrella-shaped dome. Built in the style of Armenian religious architecture, it has cut-stone fascia. Within the church there are paintings that are based on similar ones at the Echmiatsin Church, which is a blend of Christian and Islamic art forms.

Downstream of the monastery is an area of  where the village, the cemetery, and an associated church are located. The village is destroyed except for the church, which is built in the form of a basilica, with four pillars supporting a cupola. The cemetery in the village has tombs dated to 16th century.

It has a dome that is supported over a tambour, but the rest of the structures next to the chapel are in ruins.

Chapel of Dzordzor
Before the building was dismantled, detailed plans were made and the dismantled elements numbered so that they could be reassembled to the same design at the new site. Of 1500 stones used at the new site to rebuild the chapel with the dome, only 250 were new stones as all the numbered stones from the old site were able to be reassembled according plan. This reconstruction was carried out during the period 1987–88.

References

Bibliography

 

Christian monasteries established in the 7th century
Christian monasteries established in the 14th century
Armenian Apostolic churches in Iran
Armenia–Iran relations
World Heritage Sites in Iran
History of West Azerbaijan Province
History of East Azerbaijan Province
Buildings and structures in West Azerbaijan Province
Buildings and structures in East Azerbaijan Province
Tourist attractions in West Azerbaijan Province
Tourist attractions in East Azerbaijan Province